A Gasoline Wedding is a 1918 American short comedy film starring Harold Lloyd.

Plot summary

Cast
 Harold Lloyd as The Boy
 Snub Pollard
 Bebe Daniels
 William Blaisdell
 Sammy Brooks
 Lige Conley (credited as Lige Cromley)
 William Gillespie
 Maynard Laswell (credited as M.A. Laswell)
 James Parrott

Plot
Harold plays a poor boy intent on wooing well-to-do Bebe.  Her father would prefer she marry a much older but wealthy suitor whom Bebe considers to be a "neanderthal".  When Bebe hears her father concocting a kidnapping plot with the rich suitor, she dresses her butler in her clothes and flees with Harold.  Both couples arrive at the minister's house.  The rich suitor does not realize he has actually "married" the butler until Harold and Bebe are wed.

Reception
Like many American films of the time, A Gasoline Wedding was subject to cuts by city and state film censorship boards. For example, the Chicago Board of Censors required a cut of two closeups of a coin.

Survival status
Prints of the film are held in the UCLA Film and Television Archive and the BFI National Archive.

See also
 Harold Lloyd filmography

References

External links
 
 
 

1918 films
1918 short films
American silent short films
1918 comedy films
American black-and-white films
Films directed by Alfred J. Goulding
Silent American comedy films
Films with screenplays by H. M. Walker
American comedy short films
1910s American films